The 2007 FIBA Europe Under-20 Championship for Women Division B was the third edition of the Division B of the Women's European basketball championship for national under-20 teams. It was held in Druskininkai, Lithuania, from 13 to 22 July 2007. Montenegro women's national under-20 basketball team won the tournament.

Participating teams

  (15th place, 2006 FIBA Europe Under-20 Championship for Women Division A)

First round
In the first round, the teams were drawn into two groups of five. The first four teams from each group advance to the quarterfinals, the last teams will play for the 9th place.

Group A

Group B

9th place match

Championship playoffs

Quarterfinals

5th–8th place playoffs

Semifinals

7th place match

5th place match

3rd place match

Final

Final standings

References

2007
2007–08 in European women's basketball
International youth basketball competitions hosted by Lithuania
FIBA U20
July 2007 sports events in Europe